The Tell-Tale Heart is a 1953 American animated psychological horror short film produced by UPA, directed by Ted Parmelee, and narrated by James Mason. The screenplay by Bill Scott and Fred Grable is based on the 1843 short story of the same name by Edgar Allan Poe. The British Board of Film Censors made this the first cartoon to receive an adults-only X certificate in the United Kingdom.

Synopsis 
The plot focuses on a murderer whose increasing guilt leads him to believe he can hear his victim's heart still beating beneath the floorboards where he buried him. Seen through the eyes of the nameless narrator, the surrealistic images in the film help convey his descent into madness.

Production 
Paul Julian served as both designer and color artist for film, and Pat Matthews was the principal animator.

In May 1953, pre-production started on The Tell-Tale Heart, which originally was intended to be a 3-D film. It is not known if the film was animated in this fashion, but it was not released in 3D. There is no reference to 3D in a technical trade review. Furthermore, the leaders on original prints of the film do not indicate it ever was part of a pair of 3D prints.

Reception 
The film was the first cartoon to be rated X, indicating it was suitable only for adult audiences, by the British Board of Film Censors. It was nominated for the Academy Award for Best Animated Short Film but lost to Toot, Whistle, Plunk and Boom from Walt Disney Productions.

In 1994, animation historian Jerry Beck surveyed 1000 people working in the animation industry and published the results in The 50 Greatest Cartoons: As Selected by 1,000 Animation Professionals, in which The Tell-Tale Heart ranked #24.

In 2001, the United States Library of Congress deemed the film "culturally significant" and selected it for preservation in the National Film Registry.

Availability 
The short is included as a bonus feature on the first DVD release of Hellboy.  It is also included, with commentary by Leonard Maltin and Jerry Beck, on disc 2 of The Jolly Frolics Collection.

References

External links 
 
 
 Edgar Allan Poe & The Animated Tell-Tale Heart.

1953 animated films
1950s animated short films
Films based on The Tell-Tale Heart
United States National Film Registry films
Columbia Pictures short films
1950s American animated films
1953 horror films
UPA films
1953 films
Columbia Pictures animated short films
American psychological horror films
American horror short films
1950s psychological horror films
1950s English-language films